José Rafael Magallanes (born 26 September 1955) is a Venezuelan fencer. He competed in the individual foil and épée events at the 1984 Summer Olympics.

References

External links
 

1955 births
Living people
Venezuelan male épée fencers
Olympic fencers of Venezuela
Fencers at the 1984 Summer Olympics
Pan American Games medalists in fencing
Pan American Games silver medalists for Venezuela
Pan American Games bronze medalists for Venezuela
Fencers at the 1983 Pan American Games
Medalists at the 1983 Pan American Games
Venezuelan male foil fencers
20th-century Venezuelan people
21st-century Venezuelan people